Bennington Township is located in Marshall County, Illinois, United States. As of the 2010 census, its population was 1,669 and it contained 750 housing units. Bennington Township formed from a portion of Bell Plain Township. The exact date is unknown, but it was prior to 1860.

Geography

Demographics

References

External links
City-data.com
Illinois State Archives

Townships in Marshall County, Illinois
Peoria metropolitan area, Illinois
Townships in Illinois